Yury Popov (Russian: Юрий Попов; born 19 March 1930) is a Russian rower who represented the Soviet Union. He competed at the 1956 Summer Olympics in Melbourne with the men's coxed four where they were eliminated in the semi-final.

References

1930 births
Living people
Russian male rowers
Olympic rowers of the Soviet Union
Rowers at the 1956 Summer Olympics
European Rowing Championships medalists